Diane Warren Presents Love Songs is a compilation album of love songs written by American Grammy Award and Golden Globe-winning and Academy Award-nominated songwriter Diane Warren, released by herself in 2004 to 2006 in various countries. The track listing differs for Asian editions.

Track listings
All songs written by Diane Warren.

US Edition
"I Don't Want to Miss a Thing" (Theme from Armageddon) – Aerosmith
"Because You Loved Me" (Theme from Up Close & Personal) – Celine Dion
"Can't Fight the Moonlight" (Theme from Coyote Ugly) – LeAnn Rimes
"I Turn to You" – Christina Aguilera
"How Do I Live" (Album version) (Theme from Con Air) – Trisha Yearwood
"Un-Break My Heart" – Toni Braxton
"From the Heart " (Theme from UK edition of Notting Hill) – Another Level
"I Learned from the Best" – Whitney Houston
"Saving Forever for You" – Shanice
"There You'll Be" (Theme from Pearl Harbor) – Faith Hill
"Have You Ever?" – Brandy
"If I Could Turn Back Time" – Cher
"When I See You Smile" – Bad English
"Look Away" – Chicago
"How Can We Be Lovers?" – Michael Bolton
"Love Will Lead You Back" – Taylor Dayne
"Set the Night to Music" – Roberta Flack and Maxi Priest
"I'll Never Get Over You Getting Over Me" – Exposé

Indonesian/Malaysian edition
"Because You Loved Me" (Theme from Up Close & Personal) – Celine Dion
"Can't Remember a Time – Krisdayanti
"I Learned From the Best" – Whitney Houston
"I Turn to You" – Christina Aguilera
"Un-Break My Heart" – Toni Braxton
"Love Will Lead You Back" – Taylor Dayne
"Saving Forever for You" – Shanice
"I Don't Want to Miss a Thing" (Theme from Armageddon) – Aerosmith
"Blue Eyes Blue" (Theme from Runaway Bride) – Eric Clapton
"When I See You Smile" – Bad English
"How Do I Live" (Album version) (Theme from Con Air) – Trisha Yearwood
"If I Could Turn Back Time" – Cher
"Can't Fight the Moonlight" (Theme from Coyote Ugly) – LeAnn Rimes
"There You'll Be" (Theme from Pearl Harbor) – Faith Hill
"How Can We Be Lovers?" – Michael Bolton
"Have You Ever?" – Brandy
"I'll Never Get Over You Getting Over Me" – Exposé
"Set the Night to Music" – Roberta Flack and Maxi Priest

Japanese Edition
"There You'll Be" (Theme from Pearl Harbor) – Faith Hill
"I Don't Want to Miss a Thing" (Theme from Armageddon) – Aerosmith
"Because You Loved Me" (Theme from Up Close & Personal) – Celine Dion
"Un-Break My Heart" – Toni Braxton
"Blue Eyes Blue" (Theme from Runaway Bride) – Eric Clapton
"Set the Night to Music" – Starship
"Can't Fight the Moonlight" (Theme from Coyote Ugly) – LeAnn Rimes
"Look Away" – Chicago
"When I See You Smile" – Bad English
"Love Will Lead You Back" – Taylor Dayne
"How Do I Live" (Album version) (Theme from Con Air) – Trisha Yearwood
"If I Could Turn Back Time" – Cher
"Time, Love and Tenderness" – Michael Bolton
"I Learned From the Best" – Whitney Houston 
"I Turn to You" – Christina Aguilera
"Have You Ever?" – Brandy
"I'll Never Get Over You Getting Over Me" – Exposé
"Saving Forever for You" – Shanice

Philippines Edition
"I Don't Want To Be Your Friend" – Nina
"I Don't Want to Miss a Thing" (Theme from Armageddon) – Aerosmith
"Because You Loved Me" (Theme from Up Close & Personal) – Celine Dion
"Un-Break My Heart" – Toni Braxton
"I Turn to You" – Christina Aguilera
"How Do I Live" (Album version) (Theme from Con Air) – Trisha Yearwood
"There You'll Be" (Theme from Pearl Harbor) – Faith Hill
"Blue Eyes Blue" (Theme from Runaway Bride) – Eric Clapton
"Can't Fight the Moonlight" (Theme from Coyote Ugly) – LeAnn Rimes
"I Could Not Ask for More" – Edwin McCain
"When I See You Smile" – Bad English
"If I Could Turn Back Time" – Cher
"I Learned From the Best" – Whitney Houston 
"Love Will Lead You Back" – Taylor Dayne
"I'll Never Get Over You Getting Over Me" – Exposé
"Have You Ever?" – Brandy
"Saving Forever for You" – Shanice
"How Can We Be Lovers?" – Michael Bolton

Taiwanese Edition
"Because You Loved Me" (Theme from Up Close & Personal) – Celine Dion
"Un-Break My Heart" – Toni Braxton
"I Don't Want to Miss a Thing" (Theme from Armageddon) – Aerosmith
"There You'll Be" (Theme from Pearl Harbor) – Faith Hill
"I Turn to You" – Christina Aguilera
"How Do I Live" (Album version) (Theme from Con Air) – Trisha Yearwood
"Blue Eyes Blue" (Theme from Runaway Bride) – Eric Clapton
"Can't Fight the Moonlight" (Theme from Coyote Ugly) – LeAnn Rimes
"From the Heart" (Theme from UK edition of Notting Hill) – Another Level
"I Learned From the Best" – Whitney Houston 
"Love Will Lead You Back" – Taylor Dayne
"When I See You Smile" – Bad English
"If I Could Turn Back Time" – Cher
"Look Away" – Chicago
"I'll Never Get Over You Getting Over Me" – Exposé
"Set the Night to Music" – Roberta Flack and Maxi Priest
"Have You Ever?" – Brandy
"Saving Forever for You" – Shanice

External links 
 Official Website
 
 Japanese Track Listing
 US Track Listing

2004 compilation albums
Pop compilation albums